The 2010 NASCAR Canadian Tire Series was the fourth racing season since the buy out of the CASCAR Super Series.

Overview

In 2010 many procedures in the series remained the same, with all of the races airing on TSN, in tape-delayed one-hour segments excluding Montreal and the Toronto Indy. TSN and RDS provided live coverage of the NAPA Autopro 100 from the Circuit Gilles Villeneuve on Sunday, August 29 and July 25 from the streets of Toronto. Major changes to the series included former CASCAR champion Dave Whitlock and his team closing down leaving many looking for rides. Mark Dilley joined up with Scott Steckly to run full-time and Internet superstar Pierre Bourque drove the 00 Aaron's Lucky Dog car full-time. Last year's champion Andrew Ranger did not compete full-time as his sponsors  backed out of a deal and he focused on the NASCAR K&N Pro Series East in America and elected to run only part-time in the Canadian Tire Series.

The series kicked off at Delaware Speedway with D. J. Kennington defending his win in a close battle with J. R. Fitzpatrick who would end up winning the race at Mosport International Raceway. Kennington won the third race of the year after leading only the last lap passing both Kerry Micks and Scott Steckly en route to victory at Autodrome Saint-Eustache. Ranger led the majority of the race en route to victory in Toronto while Fitzpatrick won in Edmonton starting the western road swing. Kennington led the majority of the race at Motoplex Speedway but was overtaken by Scott Steckly late in the race for the win. Jason Hathaway finished second but was demoted to ninth for illegal tire changes. Kennington picked up where he left off, earning his third victory of the season at Auto Clearing Motor Speedway, from pole position. As a result, Kennington returned to the top of the championship standings. Andrew Ranger won in Trois-Rivières, giving Fitzpatrick the points lead by one point over Kennington following the race. Don Thomson Jr. got back to his old ways by winning at the Mosport Oval. At Montreal, Andrew Ranger bumped Jason Bowles in the last turn for his fourth win of the year, both Kennington and Fitzpatrick had problems. Kennington went on to win the next two races at Riverside and Barrie Speedway to take a lead of 40 points over Fitzpatrick, into the final round of the season at Kawartha Speedway. At Kawartha, Peter Shepherd III won the race, with Kennington finishing third to claim the championship.

Schedule

Results

Races

In green, the drivers who made pole, led most laps and won the same race.

Standings

(key) Bold - Pole position awarded by time. Italics - Pole position set by final practice results or rainout. * – Most laps led.

See also
2010 NASCAR Sprint Cup Series
2010 NASCAR Nationwide Series
2010 NASCAR Camping World Truck Series
2010 NASCAR Corona Series
2010 NASCAR Mini Stock Series

References

External links
 Official Website
Canadian Tire Series Standings and Statistics for 2010

NASCAR Canadian Tire Series season

NASCAR Pinty's Series